Jack Arena is an American ice hockey coach. He has spent his career at Amherst College where he has amassed over 400 wins, several ECAC and NESCAC championships, and multiple NCAA Tournament appearances, including two NCAA Final Four appearances. Arena has also been dubbed NESCAC Coach of the Year, New England Hockey Writers ECAC East Coach of the Year, as well as the prestigious Edward Jeremiah Award for National Coach of the Year.

Arena has also served as a coach for football and baseball at Amherst, and is currently the head coach of the golf team as well.

Personal life 
Born in Randolph, Massachusetts, Arena attended Milton Academy before heading off to Amherst College as a student. At Amherst, he was a four-year member of both the men's ice hockey and baseball teams (1979–1983). Arena was hired as head coach for the ice hockey team immediately following his senior year. Arena still stands tied for fourth on Amherst's all-time scoring list.

Arena now resides on the campus of the Northfield Mount Hermon School, where he lives with his wife, Diane, and his four children, Emily, Patrick, John and Ellen.

College head coaching record

See also
 List of college men's ice hockey coaches with 400 wins

References

Year of birth missing (living people)
Living people
American ice hockey coaches
Amherst Mammoths baseball players
Amherst Mammoths baseball coaches
Amherst Mammoths football coaches
Amherst Mammoths men's golf coaches
Amherst Mammoths men's ice hockey coaches
Amherst Mammoths men's ice hockey players
People from Randolph, Massachusetts
Ice hockey coaches from Massachusetts